Tummidihetti Barrage is a proposed barrage across Pranhita River, a tributary of Godavari River at Tummidihetti village, Koutala mandal, Adilabad district of Telangana State. The project will provide irrigation facilities for an ayacut of 2,00,000 acres in drought prone areas in East Adilabad District of Telangana State. .

History 
This barrage was earlier proposed as part of Pranahita Chevella lift irrigation scheme, to divert water via Gravity to Sripada Yellampalli project and thereafter via series of lifts which would culminate at Chevella; while providing irrigation facilities and drinking water to villages en route. The project could not come to fruition due to large scale submergence in the state of Maharashtra and the Government of Maharashtra not agreeing to an FRL of +152 meters. The canal work was undertaken between Tummidihetti Barrage and Sripada Yellampalli project, even though consent from the state of Maharashtra was not taken for barrage headworks for +152 meters FRL.

In 2016, the Government of Telangana and Government of Maharashtra signed an inter-state agreement with Maharashtra consenting to Tummidihetti Barrage at an FRL of +148 meters. Pranahita Chevella lift irrigation scheme, thereafter was also redesigned as Kaleshwaram Lift Irrigation Project and Dr. B.R. Ambedkar Pranahita Project

Dr. B.R. Ambedkar Pranahita Project will divert water with the help of Tummidihetti Barrage and contemplates to provide Irrigation facilities for an ayacut of 2,00,000 Acres in drought prone areas in East Adilabad District of Telangana State. The Package wise details of ayacut are as follows:

References 

Barrages in India
Dams in Telangana